Saffin is a surname. Notable people with the surname include:

 Janelle Saffin (born 1954), Australian politician
 Jeannie Saffin (1921–1982), alleged victim of spontaneous human combustion
 John Saffin (1626–1710), Boston merchant

See also
 Laffin
 Safin (name)